Gorni Balvan is a village in the municipality of Karbinci, North Macedonia.

Demographics
According to the 2002 census, the village had a total of 57 inhabitants. Ethnic groups in the village include:

Macedonians 57

References

Villages in Karbinci Municipality